Lokaksema may refer to 
Lokaksema (Hindu prayer) - A common reference in Hindu prayers
Lokaksema (Buddhist monk) - A Buddhist Monk